Piz di Strega is a mountain in the Lepontine Alps, overlooking Pass Giümela on the border between the cantons of Ticino and Graubünden. Its summit lies south of Pizzo di Ramulazz.

References

Lepontine Alps
Mountains of the Alps
Mountains of Switzerland
Mountains of Ticino
Mountains of Graubünden
Graubünden–Ticino border
Two-thousanders of Switzerland